Alexander Parrott Ramsay (1899–1957) was an English professional footballer who played as an outside left in the Football League for Newcastle United and Queens Park Rangers.

Personal life 
Ramsay served as a gunner in the Machine Gun Corps during the First World War.

Career statistics

References 

English Football League players
Newcastle United F.C. players
British Army personnel of World War I
English footballers
1899 births
1957 deaths
Footballers from Gateshead
Association football outside forwards
Machine Gun Corps soldiers
Queens Park Rangers F.C. players
Aberdare Town F.C. players
Military personnel from County Durham